The FIBT World Championships 2011 took place 14 February – 27 February 2011 in Königssee, Germany, for the fifth time, doing so previously in 1979, 1986, and 1990 (skeleton), and 2004. In 2007, the championships were awarded to Cortina d'Ampezzo, Italy over Winterberg Germany, but Cortina withdrew in February 2009 to issues with the city of Cortina.

Original selection
Cortina d'Ampezzo, Italy, was selected 21–13 over Winterberg, Germany, at the FIBT annual conference in London, England, on 2 June 2007.

It was to have been Cortina's tenth time hosting the event, having done so previously in 1937 (two-man), 1939 (four-man), 1950, 1954, 1960, 1966, 1981, 1989 (bobsleigh), and 1999 (bobsleigh).

The track was to have undergone a homologation to accommodate skeleton during the 2007–08 World Cup season in order for it to be used for the event, but that did not happen. Skeleton was last competed at Cortina in 1992. A World Cup event was set to take place in January 2009, but was cancelled to technical issues.

On 28 February 2009, it was announced at the world championships in Lake Placid, New York, in the United States that Königssee was selected in cooperation with the FIBT and the Bob- und Schlittenverband für Deutschland (BSD - German bobsleigh, luge, and skeleton federation).

Bobsleigh

Two-man
Switzerland's duo of Ivo Rüegg and Cedric Grand are the defending world champions. Germany's André Lange and Kevin Kuske are the Olympic champions. Grand and Lange retired after the 2010 Winter Olympics.

Four-man
The Olympic and World champions are the American foursome of Steven Holcomb, Justin Olsen, Steve Mesler, and Curtis Tomasevicz.

Two-woman
The British duo of Nicole Minichiello and Gillian Cooke are the defending World Champions. Canada's Kaillie Humphries and Heather Moyse are the Olympic champions. Minichiello will not compete this season to injuries sustained during the 2010 Winter Olympics.  Humphries and Moyse won Canada's first ever World Championship medal in women's bobsleigh with their bronze medal performance.

Skeleton

Men
Switzerland's Gregor Stähli is the defending World champion. Canada's Jon Montgomery is the Olympic champion.

Women
Germany's Marion Thees (Trott until summer 2010) is the defending World champion. Britain's Amy Williams is the Olympic champion.

Mixed team
The mixed team eventconsisting of one run each of men's skeleton, women's skeleton, 2-man bobsleigh, and 2-women bobsleighdebuted at the 2007 championships. Germany won its fourth consecutive mixed team championship.

Medal table

References

External links
Official website  

IBSF World Championships
International sports competitions hosted by Germany
2011 in bobsleigh
2011 in skeleton
2015 in German sport
Bobsleigh in Germany